KMRR (104.9 FM) is a radio station airing an adult contemporary format licensed to Spencer, Iowa. The station serves the areas of Spencer, Iowa, and Estherville, Iowa, and is owned by Saga Communications of Iowa, LLC.

KMRR-HD2
On June 29, 2018, KMRR launched an oldies format on its HD2 subchannel, branded as "Pure Oldies 98.3" (simulcast on translator K252EX 98.3 FM Spencer).

KMRR-HD3
On August 2, 2018, KMRR launched a variety hits format on its HD3 subchannel, branded as "98.9 Chuck FM" (simulcast on translator K253CV 98.5 FM Spirit Lake).

Previous logo

References

External links
KMRR's official website

Spencer, Iowa
Mainstream adult contemporary radio stations in the United States
MRR